Captain William Thomas Price  (15 November 1895 – 17 January 1982) was a World War I flying ace who hailed from Warwickshire, England. He was credited with seven aerial victories at a time when British aviation was suffering its heaviest casualties of the war. After leaving military service, he devoted his life to teaching agriculture until his retirement in 1962.

Early life
William Thomas Price was born in Acocks Green, Yardley, Warwickshire, England, on 15 November 1895. He was educated at Christ's College, London, as well as at Reading University.

World War I
He began his military service in the Royal Warwickshire Regiment, being commissioned as a temporary second lieutenant on 26 August 1915. 

Price volunteered for aviation duty and undertook pilot's training. On 28 November 1916, he was appointed a flying officer; this appointment signified his qualification as a pilot. He was seconded from the Royal Warwickshire Regiment to the Royal Flying Corps for duty. He was one of the founding members of No. 48 Squadron RFC, and served with them piloting a two-seater Bristol F.2 Fighter.

Price became a flying ace during Bloody April, 1917; British aviation suffered their heaviest casualties of World War I during that month. He scored two further victories on 9 May 1917, only to be shot down in turn by Lothar von Richthofen. Despite being wounded, he managed to land his aircraft in friendly territory north-east of Fampoux, France. On 1 July 1917 he was promoted to lieutenant, and was awarded the Military Cross for his gallantry on this occasion, which was gazetted on 18 July 1917:

"For conspicuous gallantry and devotion to duty. His machine being disabled by hostile fire, and his gun out of action, he managed by skilful handling to effect a safe landing, thus saving the machine and his passenger from capture. He has previously done fine work against hostile aircraft."

On 1 March 1918, Price was appointed a flight commander with the accompanying temporary rank of captain, and transferred to the General List of the RFC.

List of aerial victories

Post World War I
On 4 February 1919, Price transferred to the unemployed list of the Royal Air Force. After leaving military service, he taught agricultural techniques until his retirement in 1962. He died on 17 January 1982, in Leamington Spa in his native Warwickshire, England.

References
Notes

Bibliography
 

1895 births
1982 deaths
People from Yardley
Royal Warwickshire Fusiliers officers
Royal Flying Corps officers
Royal Air Force personnel of World War I
British World War I flying aces
Recipients of the Military Cross
Alumni of the University of Reading